= Lokur =

Coordinates: 15°36′N 74°58′E

- Village
- Interactive map of Lokur
- Country: India
- State: Karnataka
- District: Belgaum
- Talukas: Belgaum

Population (2001)
  - Total: 3,500

Languages
  - Official: Kannada, Marathi, Hindi
- Time zone: UTC+5:30 (IST)
- Postal code: 591234
- ISO 3166 code: IN-KA
- Vehicle registration: KA
- Website: karnataka.gov.in

Lokur is a village in Kagwad tehsil, Belgaum district, in the state of Karnataka, India. According to Census 2011 information the location code or village code of Lokur village is 597287. It is 32 kilometres (20 mi) from the sub-district headquarters at Athni and 122 kilometres (76 mi) from the district headquarters at Belgaum. As per 2009 stats, Mangasuli is the gram panchayat of Lokur village.

The total geographical area of the village is 1,164.56 hectares (2,877.7 acres). Lokur has a total population of 3,462 people. There are about 670 houses in Lokur village.

Lokur political leader

Shri.Shankar Gopal Mamadapure

Lokur village politician 30 years career, 6 times to gram panchayat leader

A very loyal, honest, village development goal in politics.

== Religion ==
The Yellamma (Renuka) Devi temple and Gramadevi temples are situated there.

== Demographics ==
Kannada and Marathi are prominent local languages.

The population numbers 3,268 as per 2011 Census of India. The village has a higher than average Sex ratio of 977, compared with Karnataka State's average of 973. The village has a literacy rate of 71.74% compared to Karnataka's literacy rate of 75.36%. The village's female literacy rate of 81.07% compared to the male literacy rate of 62.20%.

== Governance ==
Lokur village falls under the administration of a Sarpanch, an elected representative of the village, as per the Constitution of India and the Panchayati Raj Act.

== Economy ==
Agriculture is the main economic activity. Grapes, sugarcane and jowar are the main crops. Vegetables such as brinjal, beans, onion and others are also grown.
